Elisha Gilbert House is a historic home located at New Lebanon in Columbia County, New York.  Built in 1794, the home is a massive, two story frame Federal style residence with a gambrel roof and a five bay facade with a center entrance pavilion and clapboard siding.  The attic level once held a Masonic Lodge meeting hall.  Also on the property is a family cemetery and 19th century barn.

It was added to the National Register of Historic Places in 1984.

References

Houses on the National Register of Historic Places in New York (state)
Cemeteries on the National Register of Historic Places in New York (state)
Federal architecture in New York (state)
Houses completed in 1794
Cemeteries in Columbia County, New York
Houses in Columbia County, New York
National Register of Historic Places in Columbia County, New York
1794 establishments in New York (state)